Ivy Janet Aitchison (1886, Saint Helier, Jersey – 8 November 1971, London, England) better known as Ivy St. Helier was a British stage actress, composer and lyricist.

Stage 
On the stage, St. Helier played Manon la Crevette in the original production of Noël Coward's operetta Bitter Sweet (1929), a role she reprised in the 1933 film version.  She also starred in Coward's revue Words and Music.  As a lyricist, she wrote additional songs for The Street Singer, and for The Blue Train, the London musical by Reginald Arkell, Dion Titheradge and Robert Stolz.

Film
She made five films, including Laurence Olivier's Henry V (1944) and London Belongs to Me (1948).

Filmography

References

External links
 

 Bitter-Sweet

1886 births
1971 deaths
British stage actresses
British lyricists
Jersey actresses
People from Saint Helier